Stergamataea is a genus of moths in the family Geometridae first described by George Duryea Hulst in 1896.

Species
Stergamataea inornata Hulst, 1896
Stergamataea delicatum (Hulst, 1900)

References

Caberini